Lee Chia-fen (born 10 August 1963) is a Taiwanese educator and politician and the wife of Han Kuo-yu. Lee was born to a family of politicians in Xiluo, Yunlin County. She earned a master of science in education from the National Chiayi University. She received her bachelor's of science in radio, television and film from Shih Hsin University. Lee currently serves as vice chair in Victoria Academy. Lee has worked as a journalist, host at radio station, and served on the Yunlin County Council for three terms.

Family

Lee's father, Lee Jih-kuei, used to be in the gravel business.  He later served in the Yunlin County Council for three terms. However, due to his deteriorating health (asthma), Lee Chia-fen succeeded her father in office. Lee's family has a close relationship with Chang Jung-wei's family. Lee's younger brother Lee Ming-che has also served on the Yunlin County Council. Lee and her husband have two daughters (Han Bing Han Chin) and a son (Han Tien).

References 

21st-century Taiwanese educators
21st-century Taiwanese women politicians
21st-century Taiwanese politicians
Living people
1963 births
Politicians of the Republic of China on Taiwan from Yunlin County
Kuomintang politicians in Taiwan
Shih Hsin University alumni
Taiwanese journalists
Taiwanese women journalists
Taiwanese radio presenters
Taiwanese women radio presenters
21st-century women educators
20th-century Taiwanese women politicians
Spouses of Taiwanese politicians
Women local politicians in Taiwan